A button knot is a knot that forms a bulge of thread. Button knots are essentially stopper knots, but may be esthetically pleasing enough to be used as a button on clothes.

There are many methods for tying button knots, such as the Chinese button knot, the Celtic button knot and the monkey fist. The Ashley Book of Knots contains over a hundred examples.

References 

Decorative knots
Stopper knots